Kentucky Route 239 (KY 239) is a  state highway in the U.S. state of Kentucky. The highway connects mostly rural areas of Fulton and Hickman counties with the Tennessee state line.

Route description

KY 239 begins at the Tennessee state line just east of Jordan, within Fulton County, where the roadway continues as Tennessee State Route 21. On the state line, it has an intersection with KY 116 (East State Line Road). It travels to the north-northeast and immediately curves to the north-northwest. It curves to the north and intersects KY 166. The highway curves to the north-northeast and intersects the eastern terminus of KY 1128. It curves to the north and enters Cayce, where it intersects KY 94. It curves to the north-northeast and intersects the northern terminus of KY 1129. When the highway crosses over Little Bayou de Chien, it enters Hickman County.

KY 239 continues to the north-northeast. Just southeast of Moscow, the highway intersects the western terminus of KY 1529 before it crosses over Bayou de Chien. KY 239 curves back to the north and crosses over Hurricane Branch before meeting its northern terminus, an intersection with KY 123. Here, the roadway continues as Bakers Road.

Major intersections

See also

References

External links 

0239
Transportation in Fulton County, Kentucky
Transportation in Hickman County, Kentucky